Charles Graves Untermeyer, known as Chase Untermeyer (born March 7, 1946), is a former United States ambassador to Qatar. He was given a recess appointment by U.S. President George W. Bush and assumed the position on August 2, 2004. After three years, he was succeeded by Joseph LeBaron.

A native of Long Branch, New Jersey, Untermeyer graduated in 1964 from Memorial High School in Houston, Texas and, later (1968), from Harvard University in Cambridge, Massachusetts. While at Harvard, he worked in the 1966 congressional campaign of future U.S. President George Herbert Walker Bush of Houston.

He entered the United States Navy after Harvard under the Naval Reserve Officer Training Corps program. He served during the Vietnam War as an officer aboard the Pacific Fleet destroyer USS Benner (DD-807) and as aide and flag lieutenant to the late Rear Admiral Draper L. Kauffman, Commander of U.S. Naval Forces in the Philippines.

Returning to Houston, Untermeyer was a reporter for the Houston Chronicle and executive assistant to the county judge of Harris County, Texas. In 1976, he was elected as a Republican to the Texas House of Representatives from Houston, serving until 1981, when he went to Washington. There he served as executive assistant to then-Vice President George H.W. Bush, 1981-1983; Deputy Assistant Secretary of the Navy for Installations and Facilities, 1983-1984; Assistant Secretary of the Navy for Manpower and Reserve Affairs, 1984-1988; assistant to the President and Director of the Office of Presidential Personnel, 1989-1991; and Director of the Voice of America, 1991-1993.

Returning once more to Houston, Untermeyer was Director of Public Affairs for Compaq from 1993 to 2002, and Vice President for Government Affairs and professor of public policy at the University of Texas Health Science Center at Houston from 2002 to 2004.

His part-time public positions include: member and chairman of the United States Naval Academy Board of Visitors, 1993-1996; member of the Houston Port Commission, 1995-1998; member of the board of directors of National Public Radio (NPR), 1996-1998; member of the Texas State Board of Education, 1999-2003, serving as chairman from 1999-2001; member of the board of the Conservation Trust of Puerto Rico (Fideicomiso de Conservación de Puerto Rico), 2002-2004; member of the Defense Health Board, 2008-2009; founding board member of the Episcopal Health Foundation, 2013-2016; and founding chairman of the Qatar-America Institute, 2017-2019. He is currently a member of the Council on Foreign Relations and chairman of the board of Humanities Texas, the state humanities council.

He married the former Diana Cumming Kendrick of Sheridan, Wyoming, in 1990. They have a daughter, Ellyson Chase Untermeyer (born in 1993).

Works
 When Things Went Right: The Dawn of the Reagan-Bush Administration; Chase Untermeyer; Texas A&M University Press (August 8, 2013); 
 How Important People Act: Behaving Yourself in Public; Chase Untermeyer; Bright Sky Press (February 1, 2015); 
 Inside Reagan's Navy: The Pentagon Journals; Chase Untermeyer; Texas A&M University Press (April 7, 2015); 
 Zenith: In the White House with George H. W. Bush; Chase Untermeyer; Texas A&M University Press (August 24, 2016);

References

External links

 

|-

1946 births
Ambassadors of the United States to Qatar
University of Texas Health Science Center at Houston faculty
United States Navy personnel of the Vietnam War
Harvard University alumni
Living people
Republican Party members of the Texas House of Representatives
Military personnel from Houston
People from Long Branch, New Jersey
United States Assistant Secretaries of the Navy
United States Navy officers
Voice of America people
21st-century American diplomats
Military personnel from New Jersey